Lala Lakshmipat Singhania (1910–1976) was a pioneering Indian entrepreneur and industrialist. A son of the prominent industrialist Lala Kamlapat Singhania, he was a key architect of J. K. Organisation, one of India's largest business houses, and he endowed the Lakshmipat Singhania Academy.

In 2010 a commemorative stamp was issued to mark the centenary of his birth.

References

1910 births
1976 deaths
Indian industrialists
20th-century Indian philanthropists